The 2018 season is Persija Jakarta's 85th competitive season since 1933 and the 24th in a row in the top flight since 1994. Along with the Liga 1, the club competed in the Piala Indonesia and the AFC Cup, with the latter being their first appearance since 2001. The season covers the period from 1 January to 31 December 2018.

Coaching staff

Other Information 

|-

|}

Squad information

First-team squad

Pre-season

Friendly Matches

2018 Indonesia President's Cup

Group stage

Knockout phase

Competitions

Overview

Top scorers 
The list is sorted by shirt number when total goals are equal.

Clean sheets 
The list is sorted by shirt number when total clean sheets are equal.

Disciplinary record 
Includes all competitive matches. Players listed below made at least one appearance for Persija Jakarta first squad during the season.

Last updated:  
Source: Competitions 
Only competitive matches 
 = Number of bookings;  = Number of sending offs after a second yellow card;  = Number of sending offs by a direct red card.

Notes:

Summary

New contracts

Transfers

In

Out

Loan In

Loan Out

References 

Persija Jakarta
Persija Jakarta seasons